Jack Arthur Wood Jr. was born December 28, 1923, and died July 4, 2005. He was a three-term state senator of Idaho, then served two terms as state chairman of Democrats for Ronald Reagan in 1984. He also was county coroner for three terms in Bonneville County, Idaho. He was also a member of the Church of Jesus Christ of Latter-day Saints.

Early life 
Wood was born on December 28, 1923, in his grandfather's funeral home in Murray, Utah. After moving to Idaho Falls, Idaho, and attending Idaho Falls High School, he enlisted with the United States Navy. He then briefly returned to Idaho before serving a LDS Mission in Northern California and Oregon; returning 1949. He was shortly married after.

External links
Mortuaries Life Overview 

1923 births
2005 deaths
Latter Day Saints from Idaho
People from Idaho Falls, Idaho
Democratic Party Idaho state senators
United States Navy personnel of World War II
20th-century American politicians